The Amazing Race 9 is the ninth season of the American reality television show The Amazing Race. It featured eleven teams of two competing in a race around the world.

The season premiered on CBS on February 28, 2006, and concluded on May 17, 2006.

Best friends BJ Averell and Tyler MacNiven were the winners of this season, while friends Eric Sanchez and Jeremy Ryan finished in second place, and dating couple Ray Whitty and Yolanda Brown-Moore finished in third.

Production

Development and filming

Filming ran from November 7, 2005, to December 3, 2005. This season visited ten countries on five continents, three of which were new: Greece, Japan, and Oman.

Additionally, this season of The Amazing Race was the first (and to date, currently the only) season to begin and end at the same location: Red Rocks Amphitheatre, located outside of Denver, Colorado.

Awards
On August 27, 2006, season 9 won a Primetime Emmy Award for Outstanding Reality-Competition Program, the fourth consecutive award for the series.

Cast 

Following the Family Edition, this season returned to the traditional format with eleven teams of two. The teams included hippie best friends, a couple married for forty years, and sisters living in different states.

After the season finale, Eric announced that he and Danielle were dating. After the two participated in the All-Star season in 2007, Eric & Danielle announced in an interview that they were no longer dating due to the distance and were now just friends.

Ray proposed to Yolanda on The Early Show the morning after the season finale, and she accepted. The Early Show also showed their full progress on the final leg of The Amazing Race, including Yolanda's progress on the final Roadblock.

Future appearances
Eric Sanchez and Danielle Turner returned in The Amazing Race: All-Stars. Jeremy Ryan also appeared in the closing minutes of the season finale.

Results
The following teams are listed with their placements in each leg. Placements are listed in finishing order. 
A  placement with a dagger indicates that the team was eliminated. 
An  placement with a double-dagger indicates that the team was the last to arrive at a pit stop in a non-elimination leg. As a penalty, they were stripped of their money, bags, and possessions other than their passports and the clothes they had on upon checking in, and they received no money at the start of the next leg.
An italicized placement indicates a team's placement at the midpoint of a double leg.
A  indicates that the team won the Fast Forward. 
A  indicates that the team used the Yield and a  indicates the team on the receiving end of the Yield. 

Notes

Race summary

Leg 1 (United States → Brazil)

Episode 1: "Here We Go, Baby, Off to Win a Million Bucks!" (February 28, 2006)
Prize:  each (awarded to Eric & Jeremy)
Eliminated: John & Scott
Locations
Morrison, Colorado (Red Rocks Park – Red Rocks Amphitheatre) (Starting Line)
 Denver → São Paulo, Brazil
São Paulo (Hotel Unique )
São Paulo (Viaduto Santa Efigênia )
São Paulo (Caverna Moto Peças  Campo de Marte Airport) 
São Paulo (Santa Cecília – Vavá Artigos Religiosos E Esotéricos) (Unaired)
São Paulo (Santa Cecília – 114A Rua Frederico Abranches)
São Paulo (Estádio Municipal Paulo Machado de Carvalho) 
Episode summary
Teams set off from Red Rocks Amphitheatre and drove to Denver International Airport, where they had to book one of the three flights to São Paulo, Brazil. While the three flights were scheduled to arrive within 30–35 minutes of one other, some of those arrival times changed due to flight delays. Once in São Paulo, teams had to make their way to the rooftop of the Hotel Unique in order to find their next clue, which directed them to the Viaduto Santa Efigênia.
 This season's first Detour was a choice between Motor Head or Rotor Head. In Motor Head, teams had to travel to a motorcycle shop and assemble a motorcycle using the parts provided with a finished model for reference. When the motorcycle was properly assembled and the mechanic could start the bike, teams received their next clue. In Rotor Head, teams had to travel to Campo de Marte Airport, where they had to use a flight directory to locate one of three buildings from a helicopter; each location varied in distance with only a limited number of tickets provided for each. Once teams found their destination, the pilot landed the helicopter on the rooftop of that building so that teams could search a designated area for their next clue.
After completing the Detour, teams had to find a sanctuary on Rua Federico Abranches and light a candle as part of a traditional ceremony known as Candomblé in order to receive their next clue, which directed them to the pit stop at the Estádio Municipal Paulo Machado de Carvalho.
Additional notes
After the Detour, the clue instructed teams to travel to the district of Santa Cecília and find the Vavá store to purchase the white candle they were later shown lighting in the sanctuary; this portion of the task was unaired.

Leg 2 (Brazil)

Episode 2: "I'm Filthy, and I Love It" (March 7, 2006)
Prize: A trip to Tahiti (awarded to BJ & Tyler)
Eliminated: Lisa & Joni
Locations
São Paulo (Estádio Municipal Paulo Machado de Carvalho) 
São Paulo (Edifício Copan) 
 São Paulo → Brotas
Brotas (Camping Bela Vista  Usina Jacaré) 
Brotas (Fazenda Primavera da Serra) 
Episode summary
At the beginning of this leg, teams were instructed to travel to Edificio Copan and search for Bloco F in order to find their next clue.
 In this season's first Roadblock, one team member had to climb one of three stairwells on the building's fire escape. Once at the top, they had to put on a harness and rappel  down the building in order to receive their next clue.
After completing the Roadblock, teams traveled to Terminal Rodoviário Barra Funda and had to find tickets for one of three charter buses leaving the next day to Brotas.
 This leg's Detour was a choice between Press It or Climb It. In Press It, teams had to drive to Camping Bela Vista to process raw sugar cane and distill its juice. Teams then had to make 500 milliliters of ethanol to fuel their cars as an alternative fuel source. After completing the task, teams received their next clue. In Climb It, teams traveled to Usina Jacaré and hiked to a nearby waterfall. Once there, they climbed  to the top of the waterfall using mechanical ascenders in order to receive their next clue.
Teams had to check in at the pit stop: the Fazenda Primavera da Serra coffee plantation in Brotas.

Leg 3 (Brazil → Russia → Germany)

Episode 3: "I'm In Russia Playing With Dolls" (March 14, 2006)& Episode 4: "It's Not Over Until the Phil Sings" (March 21, 2006)
Prize: A trip to Africa (awarded to Eric & Jeremy)
Eliminated: Wanda & Desiree
Locations
Brotas (Fazenda Primavera da Serra) 
Brotas (Kilometer 114 Highway SP-225)
 Brotas → São Paulo
 São Paulo → Moscow, Russia
Moscow (Chaika Bassein ) 
Moscow (Novodevichiy Monastery – Smolensky Cathedral)
Moscow (8 Trolley Park  Dubrovka Theatre ) 
Moscow (Saint Basil's Cathedral) 
 Moscow → Frankfurt, Germany
 Frankfurt → Stuttgart
Stuttgart (Mercedes-Benz Headquarters – Mercedes-Benz Werk Untertürkheim)
Bad Tölz (Ellbach Field ) 
Grünwald (Bavaria Film Studios) 
Munich (Siegestor) 
Episode summary (Episode 3)
At the beginning of this leg, teams had to drive to a marked entrance near kilometer 114 Highway SP-225, and then ride a  zip-line from the top of the hill before receiving their next clue. Teams were instructed to return to São Paulo on one of three buses departing forty-five minutes apart to São Paulo's Guarulhos International Airport, and then fly to Moscow, Russia.
 In this leg's first Roadblock, one team member had to put on a swimsuit, dive off a  diving platform into the pool below, and then swim to retrieve their next clue.
After completing the Roadblock, teams had to travel to the Novodevichiy Monastery and locate the Smolensky Cathedral in order to find their next clue.
 This leg's first Detour was a choice between Scrub or Scour. In Scrub, teams had to travel to a trolleybus depot and thoroughly wash a Russian public trolleybus inside and out to the satisfaction of the attendant in order to receive their next clue. In Scour, teams had to travel to the Dubrovka Theatre to search among 1,500 Russian nesting dolls in order to find one of ten with a microscopic clue hidden inside.
After completing the first Detour, teams had to travel to Red Square and then search behind Saint Basil's Cathedral for Phil, who told them that the leg was not over before handing them their next clue.
Episode summary (Episode 4)
Teams were instructed to fly to Frankfurt, Germany and then travel by train to Stuttgart. Once in Stuttgart, teams had to travel to the flagship Mercedes-Benz headquarters, where they had to choose a car and driver who took them on a ride through a test course at the factory known as the Wall of Death.
 In this leg's second Roadblock, one team member had to search among 150 hats and feet scattered across a large field for one of eleven hidden Travelocity Roaming Gnomes, which had their next clue printed on its base.
After completing the second Roadblock, teams had to drive to Grünwald and find their next clue at the gate of Bavaria Film Studios. 
 This leg's second Detour was a choice between Break It or Slap It. In Break It, teams broke stunt bottles over each other's heads until they found prost (the German word for cheers) written on the back of the label in order to receive their next clue. However, they could only smash one bottle per cuckoo from a traditional German cuckoo clock. In Slap It, teams had to learn and correctly perform a traditional Schuhplattler dance in order to receive their next clue.
After completing the second Detour, teams had to drive to Munich and check in at the pit stop: the Siegestor.
Additional notes
The prize was given to the first team who brought a Travelocity gnome to the pit stop. Eric & Jeremy won the prize.
Leg 3 was a double leg that was aired over two episodes.

Leg 4 (Germany → Italy)

Episode 5: "Good Thing I Took That Human Anatomy Class in High School" (March 28, 2006)
Prize: Digital imaging package (awarded to BJ & Tyler)
Eliminated: Danielle & Dani
Locations
Munich (Siegestor) 
 Munich → Palermo, Italy
Palermo (Teatro Massimo)
Castellammare del Golfo (Seaside Terrace)
Castellammare del Golfo (Premiata Fonderia Birrione Campane & Via Don Leonardo Zangara  Corso Giuseppe Garibaldi) 
Calatafimi-Segesta (Amphitheater)  
Calatafimi-Segesta (Tempio di Segesta) 
Episode summary
At the beginning of this leg, teams were instructed to fly to Palermo on the Italian island of Sicily. Once in Palermo, teams had to travel to the Teatro Massimo, where they had to search the grounds for their next clue. Teams were then instructed to travel to Castellammare del Golfo and find their next clue at the Seaside Terrace overlooking the Castello Normanno Lighthouse.
 This leg's Detour was a choice between Foundry or Laundry. In Foundry, teams had to walk to a nearby foundry to pick up a  iron-cast bell. Teams then had to load the bell onto an Ape, drive to Via Don Leonardo Zangara, and deliver the bell to a priest at Chiesa Maria SS. Del Soccorso in order to receive their next clue. In Laundry, teams had to search through over 2,400 pieces of laundry for one of sixteen pieces of clothing bearing a red and yellow tag, which they could exchange for their next clue.
After completing the Detour, teams had to travel to Calatafimi-Segesta and find their next clue at the Amphitheater.
 In this leg's Roadblock, one team member had to correctly piece together a classical Greek statue in order to receive their next clue.
After completing the Roadblock, teams had to travel on foot to the nearby Tempio di Segesta in order to check in at the pit stop.
Additional notes
 Lake & Michelle chose to Yield Danielle & Dani.

Leg 5 (Italy)

Episode 6: "Sleep Deprivation Is Really Starting to Irritate Me" (April 5, 2006)
Prize: Cruise for two to Mexico (awarded to Eric & Jeremy)
Eliminated: Dave & Lori
Locations
Calatafimi-Segesta (Tempio di Segesta) 
Catania (Anfiteatro Romano)
Catania (Il Mercato Storico la Pescheria ) 
Syracuse (Ponte Umbertino ) 
Syracuse (Fonte Aretusa) 
Episode summary
At the beginning of this leg, teams had to drive to Catania. There, they had to find the Anfiteatro Romano and search within the ruins of the amphitheater in order to find their next clue, which instructed them to count the statue heads on the fence posts surrounding the grounds. Once teams counted the heads, they had to find the groundskeeper and give him the correct number in order to receive their next clue.
 This leg's Detour was a choice between Big Fish or Little Fish. In Big Fish, teams had to travel on foot to a street vendor in Via Alessi, pick up a 30-pound swordfish, and then carry it another  to Il Mercato Storico la Pescheria. At the market, teams had to find the fish vendor and exchange their swordfish for their next clue. In Little Fish, teams had to travel on foot to the same fish market and sell  of a small fish known as triglia in order to receive their next clue.
After completing the Detour, teams had to travel to the Ponte Umbertino in Syracuse in order to find their next clue.
 In this leg's Roadblock, one team member had to participate in kayak polo. They had to join a professional team and participate in an ongoing match. When they scored one goal, they could receive their next clue.
Teams had to check in at the pit stop: the Fonte Aretusa in Syracuse.

Leg 6 (Italy → Greece)

Episode 7: "Herculean Effort for Some Herculean Dudes" (April 12, 2006)
Prize: A trip to the premiere of The Da Vinci Code in Hollywood, California (awarded to Eric & Jeremy)
Eliminated: Lake & Michelle
Locations
Syracuse (Fonte Aretusa) 
 Syracuse → Rome
Rome (Trevi Fountain)
Rome (Spanish Steps)
 Rome → Athens, Greece
Athens (Ancient Agora)
Athens (Plaka – Stamatopoulos Taverna) 
 Athens → Corinth
Corinth (Isthmos Railway Station)
Corinth (Corinth Canal) 
Nemea (Ancient Stadium) 
Rio (Fortress of Rio) 
Episode summary
At the beginning of this leg, teams were instructed to travel by train to Rome. At the Trevi Fountain in Rome, teams had to find a man with a yellow and red scooter, who gave them their next clue and one half of Leonardo da Vinci's drawing of the Vitruvian Man. Teams were then instructed to travel to the Spanish Steps, where they found carriages with black leather portfolios containing their next clue and the other half of the Vitruvian Man.
Teams were instructed to fly to Athens, Greece. Once in Athens, teams had to travel to the Ancient Agora in order to find their next clue, which directed them to travel by train from Athens and exit at the Isthmos Railway Station in Corinth in order to find their next clue.
 This season's first Fast Forward required one team to travel on foot to Stamatopoulos Taverna in Athens and smash plates. Teams had to find a route marker flag baked into only one out of hundreds of plates. Eric & Jeremy won the Fast Forward.
 In this leg's Roadblock, one team member had to bungee jump  into the Corinth Canal in order to receive their next clue.
 For this Ancient Greek-inspired Detour, teams drove to the Ancient Stadium in Nemea and had to choose between either Herculean Effort or It's All Greek To Me. In Herculean Effort, teams had to complete three events from the Ancient Olympic Games. One team member had to throw the discus, the other team member had to do the javelin throw, and both team members had to participate in Greco-Roman wrestling and push an opponent out of a  circle in order to receive their next clue. In It's All Greek To Me, teams entered an archaeological site and searched for nine pieces of pottery containing Greek letters. Teams then had to translate the letters from Greek to English and unscramble them to spell out a location on a Greek map – Dimitsana (Δημητσανα) – in order to receive their next clue.
Teams had to check in at the pit stop: the Fortress of Rio, overlooking the Rio–Antirrio Bridge, in Rio.
Additional notes
The bungee jump into the Corinth Canal was later revisited on season 29 as a Switchback.
In the spirit of The Da Vinci Code, teams had to figure out how to arrange the two parchments of the Vitruvian Man in order to reveal a message. The first team to bring the solution to the pit stop would win the prize. Eric & Jeremy, who were the first to arrive at the pit stop, were able to put the message together and were awarded the prize.

Leg 7 (Greece → Oman)

Episode 8: "Here Comes the Bedouin" (April 19, 2006)
Prize: A trip to Rome, Italy (awarded to Fran & Barry)
Locations
Rio (Fortress of Rio) 
 Antirrio (Antirrio Visitor Center) → Athens
 Athens → Muscat, Oman
Muscat (Riyam Park)
Sur (Baith Al Battha) 
Al Hawiyah (Shuwa Area) 
Jabrin (Jabreen Castle) 
Episode summary
At the beginning of this leg, teams were instructed to fly to Muscat, Oman. Teams first had to sign up for one of two charter buses departing an hour apart that took them to the Athens International Airport, where they then flew to Muscat. Once in Muscat, teams had to go to Riyam Park and find a giant incense burner in order to find their next clue.
 This leg's Detour was a choice between Camel or Watchtower. In Camel, teams had to make their way across the creek on a ferry to the opposite bank, where they had to lift a camel into a truck using a winch. They then had to use a map to drive  to a Bedouin camp and deliver the camel in order to receive their next clue. In Watchtower, teams had to cross the river and search three watchtowers for an Arabian message box scroll, although not every watchtower had a scroll. After they found it, they had to travel  to Al-Sayegh Gold and Silversmith and exchange their scroll for their next clue.
 In this leg's Roadblock, one team member had to dig into 117 sand dunes until they found one of six Omani underground ovens with a shuwa, a woven pouch with a meal of lamb wrapped in a dried palm leaf bag and steamed in the oven, in order to receive their next clue.
Teams had to check in at the pit stop: Jabreen Castle in Jabrin.
Additional notes
This was a non-elimination leg.

Leg 8 (Oman → Australia)

Episode 9: "Do You Know How Much Running I Did Today, Phil?" (April 26, 2006)
Prize: A trip to Hong Kong (awarded to Eric & Jeremy)
Eliminated: Fran & Barry
Locations
Jabrin (Jabreen Castle) 
 Muscat → Perth, Australia
Perth (Kings Park – State War Memorial)
 Fremantle → Rottnest Island
 Rottnest Island (Wadjemup Lighthouse)
 Rottnest Island (Salmon Bay) 
 Rottnest Island → Fremantle or Perth
Fremantle (Fremantle Prison) 
Fremantle (Fremantle Sailing Club – South Breakwater) 
Episode summary
At the beginning of this leg, teams were instructed to fly to Perth, Australia. Once in Perth, teams had to travel to Kings Park and search for the State War Memorial in order to find their next clue. Teams were instructed to travel by ferry to Rottnest Island. Once there, teams had to pick up a tandem bicycle from a bike shop and pedal  to Wadjemup Lighthouse in order to find their next clue.
 This leg's Detour was a choice between Sand or Sea. In Sand, teams had to drag 40 branches  to a sand dune, an activity known as "brushing the beach", which helps to prevent beach erosion, in order to receive their next clue. In Sea, teams had to dive into the waves and search among 50 underwater crayfish traps on the ocean floor for those with live Western rock lobsters. Each team member had to retrieve one lobster and deliver them to a fisherman in order to receive their next clue.
After completing the Detour, teams had to pedal back to the bike shop, travel by ferry back to the mainland, and then travel to Fremantle Prison in order to find their next clue.
 In this leg's Roadblock, one team member had to search Division No. 4 of Fremantle Prison for one of several cells that contained a flashlight. They then had to search for an entrance to a darkened cavern, descend underground, and use the flashlight to search for a set of either wet or dry tunnels for their next clue.
Teams had to check in at the pit stop: the South Breakwater at the Fremantle Sailing Club.

Leg 9 (Australia)

Episode 10: "Man, They Should Have Used Their Fake Names" (May 3, 2006)
Prize: Two one-year leases for Mercedes ML350s (awarded to Ray & Yolanda)
Locations
Fremantle (Fremantle Sailing Club – South Breakwater) 
Perth (City Centre – Swan Bells Tower)
 Perth → Darwin
Darwin (Berrimah – Crocodylus Park)
Batchelor (Batchelor Airfield – Darwin Parachute Club)  
Litchfield National Park (Magnetic Termite Mounds)
Litchfield National Park (Buley Rockhole  The Lost City) 
Lake Bennett (Lake Bennett Wilderness Resort) 
Episode summary
At the beginning of this leg, teams had to drive to Perth and climb to the top of the Swan Bells Tower in order to find their next clue. Teams were instructed to fly to Darwin. Once in Darwin, teams drove to Crocodylus Park, where they had to wade into a pond full of crocodiles in order to retrieve their next clue.
Once on the ground, they received their next clue.
After completing the Roadblock, teams had to travel to the Litchfield National Park, where they had to search for their next clue among the magnetic termite mounds.
 This leg's Detour was a choice between Wet or Dry. In Wet, teams had to drive  to a swimming hole called Buley Rockhole, and then hike and swim  down a river infested with spiders and poisonous plants in order to retrieve their next clue. Once there, teams had to select a didgeridoo and follow the sound of music in order to locate a nearby Aboriginal musician with a matching didgeridoo, who taught each team member to play a note so they could receive their next clue.
Teams had to check in at the pit stop: the Lake Bennett Wilderness Resort.
Additional notes
 BJ & Tyler chose to Yield Joseph & Monica.
This was a non-elimination leg.

Leg 10 (Australia → Thailand)

Episode 11: "I Think This Monkey Likes Me" (May 10, 2006)
Prize: A cruise around Sydney Harbour with visits to the Hunter Valley wine district and the Great Barrier Reef, and a stay at a luxury hotel while at the pit stop (awarded to Ray & Yolanda)
Eliminated: Joseph & Monica
Locations
Lake Bennett (Lake Bennett Wilderness Resort) 
 Darwin → Bangkok, Thailand
 Bangkok → Lopburi
Lopburi (Prang Sam Yot) 
Pho Kao Ton (Bo Ngoen Pla Pao Restaurant) 
 Pak Kret → Ko Kret Island
Ko Kret Island (Buddha Garden)
Ko Kret Island (Jom Jam Pottery Factory  Wat Chimphli) 
Bangkok (Marble Temple) 
Episode summary
At the beginning of this leg, teams were instructed to fly to Bangkok, Thailand. Once in Bangkok, teams had to travel by bus to Lopburi, where they found their next clue at Prang Sam Yot.
 In this leg's Roadblock, one team member had to recreate a properly arranged ceremonial feast of fruit and give it to the monkeys at Prang Sam Yot in order to receive their next clue.
 This season's second Fast Forward required teams to travel to a restaurant and eat a bowl of fried crickets and grasshoppers. BJ & Tyler won the Fast Forward.
After completing the Roadblock, teams were instructed to travel by ferry to Ko Kret Island, where they found their next clue at the Buddha Garden.
 This leg's Detour was a choice between Move It or Altar It. In Move It, teams had to go to the Jom Jam Pottery Factory and then transport a total of 72 clay pots on wooden boards balanced on their shoulders through the streets of a market to a boat in order to receive their next clue. In Altar It, teams had to go to the Wat Chimphli temple, where they had to properly assemble a shrine and then apply gold leaf to a statue of Buddha in order to receive their next clue.
Teams had to check in at the pit stop: the Marble Temple in Bangkok.
Additional notes
The clue at Prang Sam Yot contained an additional envelope inside that informed teams to not open it until they reached the pit stop. The prize on this leg was awarded to the team who had a picture of a golden gnome in their envelope. Ray & Yolanda won the prize.

Leg 11 (Thailand → Japan)

Episode 12: "5 Continents, 9 Countries, More Than 59,000 Miles" (May 17, 2006)
Prize: Two T-Mobile Sidekicks with three years of free service (awarded to BJ & Tyler)
Locations
Bangkok (Marble Temple) 
Phra Nakhon Si Ayutthaya (Royal Elephant Kraal)
 Bangkok → Tokyo, Japan
 Narita (Narita International Airport → Hotel Nikko Narita)
Tokyo (Shibuya – Shibuya Scramble Crossing)
Tokyo (Shibuya – Hachikō Statue)
Tokyo (Chūō – Hama-rikyū Gardens  Shibuya – Sankusu Street) 
Tokyo (Shibuya – Capsule Land Hotel)
Fujiyoshida (Fujikyu Highland) 
 Yamanakako (Lake Yamanaka – The Big Swan) 
Episode summary
At the beginning of this leg, teams traveled to the Royal Elephant Kraal, where they received smartphones from the elephants which displayed their next clue. Teams were instructed to fly to Tokyo, Japan. Once in Tokyo, teams had to travel to the parking lot of the Hotel Nikko Narita, search for a marked vehicle, and then drive to the Sakamoto Building in Shibuya. They then had to walk to a scramble crossing and scan the big flashing screens in order to find their next clue: Find Hachiko! They had to figure out that they had to find a statue of the namesake dog, where they found a man wearing a red and yellow scarf with their next clue.
 This leg's Detour was a choice between Maiden or Messenger. In Maiden, teams had to travel to Hama-rikyū Gardens and carry a traditional Japanese palanquin with a young Japanese woman  to a tea ceremony pavilion in order to receive their next clue. In Messenger, teams had to travel  to a parking lot and pick up a pair of folding bicycles as well as messenger bags, which each contained a parcel. Teams then had to assemble the bikes and ride through the streets of Tokyo to deliver the packages to Shinjuku Park Tower and Shinjuku Chuo Koen in Shinjuku. When they were done, teams returned to the bike parking lot in order to receive their next clue.
After completing the Detour, teams had to travel to the Capsule Land Hotel, where they received one of three departure times fifteen minutes apart the next day based on the order they arrived. The next morning, teams were directed to drive to Fujikyu Highland in Fujiyoshida in order to find their next clue.
 In this leg's Roadblock, one team member had to ride on three extreme rides in the following order: The Pizza, Dodonpa, and Fujiyama. While riding, they had to spot a man holding a message somewhere along one of the rides. After the third ride, they had to relay the message to the park manager in order to receive their next clue. If they could not, they had to go on all three rides again.
After completing the Roadblock, teams had to drive to Lake Yamanaka and pedal a swan boat to the pit stop: The Big Swan.
Additional notes
This was a non-elimination leg.

Leg 12 (Japan → United States)

Episode 12: "5 Continents, 9 Countries, More Than 59,000 Miles" (May 17, 2006)
Winners: BJ & Tyler
Second Place: Eric & Jeremy
Third Place: Ray & Yolanda
Locations
Yamanakako (Lake Yamanaka – The Big Swan) 
 Narita (Hotel Nikko Narita) → Tokyo (Narita International Airport)
 Tokyo → Anchorage, Alaska
Anchorage (Mirror Lake) 
Anchorage (Kincaid Park)
 Anchorage → Denver, Colorado
Golden (Clear Creek History Park)
Morrison (Red Rocks Park – Red Rocks Amphitheatre)  
Episode summary
At the beginning of this leg, teams were instructed to fly to Anchorage, Alaska. Once in Anchorage, teams drove to Mirror Lake, where they found their next clue.
 This season's final Detour was a choice between Drill It or Deliver It. In Drill It, teams had to use an ice auger to drill 10 holes in the ice, push an ice fishing shack to the holes, and properly position the shack over at least two of the holes in order to receive their next clue. Due to poor weather conditions, this option was subject to an indefinite delay, so all teams performed the Drill It task.
After completing the Detour, teams traveled to Kincaid Park, where they had to search the park's chalet for snowshoes and then hike to their next clue. Teams were then instructed to fly to Denver, Colorado. Once in Denver, teams traveled to Clear Creek History Park in Golden and searched the grounds for their next clue, which instructed teams to "Go Back to Where You Started", leaving them to figure out that their next destination was the starting line: Red Rocks Amphitheatre.
 In this season's final Roadblock, one team member had to search a field of 285 flags, find the nine flags representing each of the countries that they visited, and place them in chronological order. Teams had a reference board with the correct flags along with three decoy flags. Unlike normal Roadblocks, the non-participating team member could provide guidance, but could not physically assist. Once teams got the order of the flags correct, they could run to the nearby finish line.
{|class="wikitable unsortable" style="text-align:left"
|-
! scope="col" | Order
! scope="col" | Flags
|-
! scope="row" | 1
| 
|-
! scope="row" | 2
| 
|-
! scope="row" | 3
| 
|-
! scope="row" | 4
| 
|-
! scope="row" | 5
| 
|-
! scope="row" | 6
| 
|-
! scope="row" | 7
| 
|-
! scope="row" | 8
| 
|-
! scope="row" | 9
| 
|}
Additional notes
Legs 11 and 12 aired back-to-back as a special two-hour episode.

Reception

Critical response
The Amazing Race 9 received mixed reviews. Linda Holmes of Television Without Pity was negative towards this season due to it being dominated by two "obnoxious" teams writing "Dear This Season: Boo." Andy Dehnart of reality blurred wrote that this season rebounded from the previous "lame" Family Edition. Heather Havrilesky of Salon wrote "all in all, this was a really lively, fun season of 'The Amazing Race,' the kind that strengthens my undying commitment to watch every second of every hour of every season of this show". In 2016, this season was ranked 21st out of the first 27 seasons by the Rob Has a Podcast Amazing Race correspondents. In 2021, Jane Andrews of Gossip Cop ranked this season as the show's 10th best season.

Ratings
Canadian ratings

References

External links
Official website

 09
2006 American television seasons
Television shows filmed in Colorado
Television shows filmed in São Paulo (state)
Television shows filmed in Russia
Television shows filmed in Germany
Television shows filmed in Italy
Television shows filmed in Greece
Television shows filmed in Oman
Television shows filmed in Australia
Television shows filmed in Thailand
Television shows filmed in Japan
Television shows filmed in Taiwan
Television shows filmed in Alaska